International Forum on Mood and Anxiety Disorders or IFMAD is a professional organisation with the aim of spreading awareness of the latest international trend, research and innovations related to mood and anxiety disorders while encouraging the exchange of ideas among psychiatric community all over the world. Professor Siegfried Kasper and Professor Stuart Montgomery jointly founded IFMAD in the year 2000 which received supports from a scientific committee composed of prominent individuals in the domain of mood and anxiety disorders from across the world.

Activities 
The organization is known to convey annual congress for encouraging discussion and debate in the field of mood and anxiety disorder. This annual event has become an important forum for the exchange of ideas and a key part of the congress calendar. IFMAD is affiliated to Union of International Associations.  The 18th International Forum on Mood and Anxiety Disorders held at Vienna received endorsement from various organizations including Association Internationale pour la promotion de Formations Spécialisées en Médecine et en Sciences Biologiques (AFISM).

Conferences

References

External links 
 International Forum on Mood and Anxiety Disorders Official Web Site
 International Forum on Mood and Anxiety Disorders Committee
 British Association for Psychopharmacology (BAP)
 British Journal of Psichiatry
 DNB, Katalog der Deutschen Nationalbibliothek
 Professor Stuart Montgomery - British Association for Psychopharmacology - Lifetime Achievement Award 2006

International medical and health organizations
International organisations based in Monaco
Psychiatry organizations
Mood disorders
Medical and health organisations based in Monaco